Victor Hopkins (21 January 1911 – 6 August 1984) was an English cricketer who played in 139 first-class matches for Gloucestershire between 1934 and 1948.

References

External links

1911 births
1984 deaths
English cricketers
Gloucestershire cricketers
People from Dumbleton
Sportspeople from Gloucestershire
Wicket-keepers